Events in the year 1836 in India.

Incumbents
Earl of Auckland, Governor-General, 1836-42.

Law

References

 
India
Years of the 19th century in India